The Gap is a 2006 Argentine comedy-drama film directed and written by Mariano Mucci. It stars Valentina Bassi and Daniel Valenzuela.

Synopsis
When paterfamilias Escarfase (Mario Paolucci) is released from prison, he's immediately roped into a caper designed by thick-headed Ruben (Luis Ziembrowski), using a seemingly abandoned house as the command center for tunneling into the neighboring bank vault. Also on board are Escarfase's hooker daughter Mirna (Valentina Bassi), whose participation in a porn film takes up an indefensible amount of screen time considering the minuscule laugh pay-off. The opening promises more than it can deliver, but like the rest of pic, scenes start well and devolve into wasted footage. Bouncy music is used indiscriminately and, like the overly sunny lensing, gets tired quickly.

Overview
Two script docs are credited in "The Gap," but a whole surgical team is needed to excise overlong scenes and to substitute real laughs for the anarchy on display.

External links
 

2006 films
2000s Spanish-language films
2006 comedy-drama films
Argentine comedy-drama films
2000s Argentine films